Tranøy is a former municipality that was located in the old Troms county, Norway.  The municipality is situated on the southern coast of the large island of Senja. The municipality existed from 1838 until its dissolution in 2020 when it was merged into the new Senja Municipality. The administrative centre was the village of Vangsvik in the eastern part of the municipality.  Other important villages included Stonglandseidet, Skrollsvika, and Å.

The nearly-abandoned island of Tranøya, with the 18th-century wooden Tranøy Church, used to be the centre of activities for the municipality. From Tranøybotn it is only a short walk to the Ånderdalen National Park, with varied landscapes within a very limited area, including deep pine forests.

At the time of its dissolution as a municipality on 1 January 2020, the  municipality was the 204th largest by area out of the 422 municipalities in Norway. Tranøy was also the 352nd most populous municipality in Norway with a population of 1,536.

General information
The large municipality of Tranøy was established on 1 January 1838 (see formannskapsdistrikt).  The original municipality included all the land surrounding the large Solbergfjorden.  On 1 September 1886, the municipality was divided into three separate municipalities: Tranøy (population: 1,239) on the west, Dyrøy (population: 1,281) in the south, and Sørreisa (population: 1,361) in the east.

During the 1960s, there were many municipal mergers across Norway due to the work of the Schei Committee. On 1 January 1964 several changes took place:
The mainland areas of Tranøy (population: 382) were transferred to Dyrøy Municipality.
The Hellemo, Paulsrud, Johnsgård, and Stormo farms (population: 106) were transferred to Lenvik Municipality.
The parts of Bjarkøy Municipality on the island of Senja and Lemmingsvær islands (population: 480) were transferred to Tranøy Municipality.
The Rødsand area of Torsken Municipality (population: 160) was also transferred to Tranøy Municipality.

In March 2017, the Parliament of Norway voted to merge the municipalities of Berg, Torsken, Lenvik, and Tranøy.  The new municipality will encompass the whole island of Senja plus part of the mainland.  The new municipality will be established on 1 January 2020 and it will be called Senja Municipality.

Name
The municipality (originally the parish) is named after the small island of Tranøya (Old Norse: Tranøiar), since the first Tranøy Church was built there. The first element is comes from trana which means "crane" and the last element is øy which means "island".  Prior to 1909, the name was written Tranø.

Coat of arms
The coat of arms was granted on 15 May 1987. The official blazon is "Argent, a flounder embowed reversed sable". This means the arms have a field (background) that has a tincture of argent which means it is commonly colored white, but if it is made out of metal, then silver is used. The charge is an Atlantic halibut (Hippoglossus hippoglossus) that is curved like a U-shaped arch facing upwards. The fish is a main species of local fish, which symbolizes the importance of fishing for the local community. In addition to this, the fish has played a major role in local legends, similar to the role of bears in land-based legends. The arms were designed by Svein A. Berntsen.

Churches

The Church of Norway had one parish within the municipality of Tranøy. It was part of the Senja prosti (deanery) in the Diocese of Nord-Hålogaland.

Geography
The municipality of Tranøy was located on the southern end of the large island of Senja. The Andfjorden, Vågsfjorden, and Solbergfjorden surround the municipality to the west, south, and southeast. The municipalities of Torsken and Berg were located to the north and the municipality of Lenvik was to the east. Ånderdalen National Park was located in the northwestern part of the municipality.

Climate

Government
Tranøy municipality (while it existed) was responsible for primary education (through 10th grade), outpatient health services, senior citizen services, unemployment and other social services, zoning, economic development, and municipal roads. The municipality was governed by a municipal council of elected representatives, which in turn elected a mayor.  The municipality fell under the Senja District Court and the Hålogaland Court of Appeal.

Municipal council
The municipal council  of Tranøy was made up of 17 representatives that were elected to four year terms. The party breakdown of the final municipal council was as follows:

See also
List of former municipalities of Norway

References

External links

Municipal fact sheet from Statistics Norway 

Senja
Former municipalities of Norway
1838 establishments in Norway
2020 disestablishments in Norway
Populated places disestablished in 2020